Film by the Sea is an annual film festival that takes place in Vlissingen, Netherlands, in September.

Festival 
Film by the Sea was founded in 1999. The festival features both pre-premieres of major commercial films, and art house films that do not yet have a distributor in the Netherlands. A main focus of the festival is on films based on literature, which is connected to an annual festival competition. Film by the Sea takes place annually in the Cine City cinema in Vlissingen. The festival was attended by 43,300 people in 2016, and is the fourth-biggest film festival in the Netherlands. The festival has been led by artistic director Leo Hannewijk since 1999.

Awards
Awards presented include the Film and Literature Award, the Grand Acting Award, the Pearl for adapted feature film, and the Sylvia Kristel Award.

Grand Acting Award
 2000: Morgan Freeman
 2007: Ben Kingsley
 2008: Michael Nyqvist
 2013: Jan Decleir
 2014: Rutger Hauer
 2015: Monic Hendrickx
 2016: Claudia Cardinale
 2017: Bruno Ganz

The Pearl
The Pearl is an award for the best filmed adaptation of a book, voted by the public.
 2014: 12 Years a Slave
 2015: Still Alice
 2016: Public Works
 2017: Tonio

Sylvia Kristel Award
Created two years after the 2012 death of Dutch actress Sylvia Kristel of the Emmanuelle film series, this prize is awarded to someone who, like Kristel, embodies the idea of a cultural phenomenon and source of inspiration.

 2014: Sylvia Hoeks
 2015: Genevieve Gaunt
 2016: Nina de la Parra
 2017: Romy Louise Lauwers

References

External links 
 Festival website (in Dutch)

Film festivals in the Netherlands
Vlissingen